Q-16 or Q16 may refer to:

 Q16 (New York City bus), a bus route in Queens
 An-Nahl, the sixteenth surah of the Quran
 , a Naïade-class submarine
 Q16, a generalized quaternion group